Kensington and Chelsea London Borough Council in London, England, is elected every four years. Since the last boundary changes in 2014, 50 councillors have been elected from 18 wards.

Political control
Since the first elections to the council in 1964 political control of the council has been held by the following parties:

Leadership
The leaders of the council since 1965 have been:

Council elections
 1964 Kensington and Chelsea London Borough Council election
 1968 Kensington and Chelsea London Borough Council election
 1971 Kensington and Chelsea London Borough Council election
 1974 Kensington and Chelsea London Borough Council election (boundary changes increased the number of seats by one)
 1978 Kensington and Chelsea London Borough Council election (boundary changes reduced the number of seats by seven)
 1982 Kensington and Chelsea London Borough Council election
 1986 Kensington and Chelsea London Borough Council election
 1990 Kensington and Chelsea London Borough Council election
 1994 Kensington and Chelsea London Borough Council election (boundary changes took place but the number of seats remained the same)
 1998 Kensington and Chelsea London Borough Council election (boundary changes took place but the number of seats remained the same)
 2002 Kensington and Chelsea London Borough Council election (boundary changes took place but the number of seats remained the same)
 2006 Kensington and Chelsea London Borough Council election
 2010 Kensington and Chelsea London Borough Council election
 2014 Kensington and Chelsea London Borough Council election (boundary changes reduced the number of seats by four)
 2018 Kensington and Chelsea London Borough Council election
 2022 Kensington and Chelsea London Borough Council election

Borough result maps

By-election results

1964-1968
There were no by-elections.

1968-1971

1971-1974

1974-1978

1978-1982

1982-1986

1986-1990

1990-1994

The by-election was called following the resignation of Cllr. Patrick A. Younge.

The by-election was called following the resignation of Cllr. Ann E. Bond.

The by-election was called following the resignation of Cllr. Benjamin T. Bousquet.

1994-1998

The by-election was called following the resignation of Cllr. Robert A. Weems.

The by-election was called following the death of Cllr. Elizabeth A. Russell.

1998-2002

The by-election was called following the resignation of Cllr. Timothy C. A. Tannock.

2002-2006
There were no by-elections.

2006-2010

The by-election was called following the resignation of Cllr. Margot C. James.

The by-election was called following the resignation of Cllr. Marianne Alapini.

2010-2014

The by-election was called following the resignation of Cllr. Ms. Joan B. Hanham.

The by-election was called following the resignation of Cllr. Mark P. Daley.

The by-election was called following the resignation of Cllr. Barry Phelps.

The by-election was called following the death of Cllr. Iain W. F. Hanham.

The by-election was called following the death of Cllr. Andrew S. Dalton.

The by-election was called following the resignation of Cllr. Andrew F. Lamont.

The by-election was called following the death of Cllr. Ms. Shireen O. Ritchie.

2014-2018

The by-election was called following the resignation of Cllr. Merrick Cockell.

Footnotes

References

External links
Kensington and Chelsea Council